Argyrocheila undifera, the fairy white, is a butterfly in the family Lycaenidae. It is found in Sierra Leone, Ivory Coast, Ghana, Nigeria, Cameroon, Gabon, the Republic of the Congo, the Central African Republic, the Democratic Republic of the Congo, Uganda and Tanzania. Its habitat consists of primary forests.

Subspecies
Argyrocheila undifera undifera (Sierra Leone, Ivory Coast, Ghana, southern and eastern Nigeria, Cameroon, Gabon, Congo, Central African Republic, Democratic Republic of the Congo: Lualaba)
Argyrocheila undifera ugandae Hawker-Smith, 1933 (north-eastern Democratic Republic of the Congo, Uganda, north-western Tanzania)

References

Butterflies described in 1892
Poritiinae
Butterflies of Africa